Harishchandra Shaibya is a Bengali religious drama film directed by Ardhendu Chatterjee based on Hindu mythological story of legendary King Harishchandra. This film was released on 30 August 1985 under the banner of B. B. M. Group Of Production.

Plot
This film tells the life of King Harishchandra who gave away his kingdom, sold his family and agreed to be a slave to fulfill the promise and truthfulness.

Cast
 Biswajit Chatterjee as Harishchandra
 Sandhya Roy as Shaibya
 Chiranjit
 Abhi Bhattacharya as Sage Viswamitra
 Utpal Dutt as Dharmaraj
 Alka Nupur as Menaka
 Anoop Kumar as Malavya
 Tapas Paul (guest appearance)
 Shekhar Chatterjee
 Satya Bandopadhyay as Sage Vasistha
 Sumitra Mukhopadhyay

Soundtrack
Music by Ravindra Jain. Lyrics by Bibhuti Mukhopadhyay. Songs sung by Kishore Kumar, Asha Bhonsle, Aarti Mukherjee, Hemant Mukherjee, Manna De, Hemlata, Yesudas. 1 song which Ravindra Jain sang was excluded from the film.
 Drama Drimi Drimi - Kishore Kumar
 O Ma Patito Paboni Gonge - Kishore Kumar
 Keno Mukhe - Asha Bhonsle
 Shunaho Manush Bhai - Hemant Mukherjee
 Shunno Holo Ajodha - Manna De
<li> Bhor Hoilo Phool Phutilo - Manna De, Hemlata
<li> Bhalo Koro - Hemlata
<li> Tamasi Mam Jivanam - Aarti Mukherjee
<li> Om Namah Shivay - Yesudas, Aarti Mukherjee
<li> Shlok - Yesudas, Aarti Mukherjee 
<li> Thakur Tomar Ae Ki Leela - Ravindra Jain

References

External links
 

1985 films
Bengali-language Indian films
Hindu devotional films
Religious drama films
Religious epic films
Films about Raja Harishchandra
Hindu mythological films
1980s fantasy drama films
Indian fantasy drama films
1980s Bengali-language films
1985 drama films